Joseph Terrell Crowl (13 December 1883 – 27 June 1915) was an Australian rules footballer who played with Geelong in the Victorian Football League. He was killed soon after the landings in Gallipoli in World War I.

Family
The son of Joseph Terrell Crowl (1856-1924), and Matilda Orr Crowl (1924), née Forbes, Joseph Terrell Crowl was born in Melbourne on 13 December 1883.

He was the cousin of the St Kilda footballer Private Claude Terrell Crowl (337) who was killed in action whilst landing at Gallipoli, Ottoman Turkey on 25 April 1915.

See also
 List of Victorian Football League players who died in active service

Footnotes

References
 Holmesby, Russell & Main, Jim (2007). The Encyclopedia of AFL Footballers. 7th ed. Melbourne: Bas Publishing.
 Main, J. & Allen, D., "Crowl, Joseph", pp. 49–51 in Main, J. & Allen, D., Fallen – The Ultimate Heroes: Footballers Who Never Returned From War, Crown Content, (Melbourne), 2002.
 World War One Service Record: Captain Joseph Terrell Crowl, National Archives of Australia.
 World War One Nominal Roll: Captain Joseph Terrell Crowl, Australian War Memorial.
 World War One Embarkation Roll: Captain Joseph Terrell Crowl, Australian War Memorial.
 Roll of Honour: Captain Joseph Terrell Crowl, Australian War Memorial.
 Crowl, Joseph Terrell, Port Melbourne First World War Centenary.

External links

 Terry Crowl, australianfootball.com.

1883 births
1915 deaths
Australian rules footballers from Melbourne
Geelong Football Club players
Chilwell Football Club players
Australian military personnel killed in World War I
Military personnel from Melbourne